is a Japanese architect and a former professor at Chubu University (until 2009).

After studying at the University of Tokyo, Jun finished the master's degree of Architecture in Urban Design from Harvard University in 1983. His work experiences include Kenzo Tange & URTEC (1978–81), I.M.Pei & Partners (1983–85), and Maki and Associates (1985–90). After completing the award-winning Makuhari Messe as a project architect with Maki & Associates, he was appointed as an assistant professor of architecture at the University of Texas at Austin in 1990, where he received the tenure professorship in 1996. He moved to Chubu University as a professor in 1996, and was honorably appointed as a visiting professor at Chinese University of Hong Kong in 2014. He founded Jun Watanabe & Associates in 1990. He received 2 local AIA Awards in 1993 and 1995 in Austin. In 2003 he received the gold medal, Residential/ Interior category of Bienal Miami + Beach 2003, with his work of Villa Gamagori. In 2011 he received the Good Design Award, with his work of Hiroo Flat. In 2012,2014,2015,2016,2017,2018,2020 & 2021, the received the Good Design Awards, as well.

Works 
 Parents House in Chofu (1995)
 House in Kibi (1999)
 Villa Gamagori (1992)
 Chubu University Foreign Student Dormitory (2003)
 Villa Nakakaruizawa (2004)
 Orphant House‘Aster’(2005)
 Nakameguro 2-chome Condominium (2006)
 Oobu Flat (2007)
 Ogikubo Flat (2008)
 Hiroo Flat (2009)
 House in Seijo (2009)
 Michino-eki Tomika (2010)
 Condominium in Takatsu (2010)
 Renovation of the International Conference Center of Makuhari Messe

Gallery

Awards 
 1993 Citation of Honor, American Institute of Architects Austin Chapter
 1995 Design Merit, American Institute of Architects Austin Chapter
 2001 Selected Work (Design Award), Architectural Institute of Japan
 2002 Selected Work (Design Award), Architectural Institute of Japan
 2003 Gold Medal, Miami+Beach Bienale Residential Category
 2005 Selected Work (Design Award), Japan Institute of Architect
 2006 Selected Work (Design Award), Japan Institute of Architect
 2010 Selected Work (Design Award), Japan Institute of Architect
 2011 Good Design Award, Japan Institute of Design Promotion
 2012 Good Design Award, Japan Institute of Design Promotion
 2014 ARCASIA Award Industrial Building Category
 2014 Good Design Award, Japan Institute of Design Promotion
 2014 Visiting Professor, Chinese University of Hong Kong
 2015 Good Design Award, Japan Institute of Design Promotion
 2016 Good Design Award, Japan Institute of Design Promotion
 2017 Good Design Award, Japan Institute of Design Promotion
 2018 Good Design Award, Japan Institute of Design Promotion
 2020 Good Design Award, Japan Institute of Design Promotion
 2021 Good Design Award, Japan Institute of Design Promotion
 Society of Architects and Building Engineers, 2003 Award
 Society of Architects and Building Engineers, 2005 Award
 Japanese Institute of Architect, 2005 Award
 Japanese Institute of Architect, 2006 Award
 Japanese Institute of Architect, 2010 Award

References

External links 
 Jun Watanabe & Associates official site

Harvard Graduate School of Design alumni
University of Texas at Austin faculty
Japanese architects
Living people
1954 births
University of Tokyo alumni